Kaisa Hai Naseeban (previously titled Mangharat) is a 2019 Pakistani television series, produced by Abdullah Seja under their banner Idreams Entertainment. The drama aired weekly on ARY Digital. It stars Muneeb Butt and Ramsha Khan. It is based on the concept and rituals of dowry system and marital abuse prevailing in the Pakistani society. The serial was one of the highest rated serials in the history of Pakistani television with a rating of 20.87.

Cast
Ramsha Khan as Marium Jamal
Muneeb Butt as Ahmed
Uzma Gillani as Musarrat; Ahmed's mother, Paternal aunt of Marium
Waseem Abbas as Jamal; Marium's father
Nida Mumtaz as Shahana; Marium's mother
Shehzeen Rahat as Sana; Ahmed's sister
Farah Shah as Sofia; Maternal aunt of Marium
Anumta Qureshi as Farah, Youngest sister of Marium
Agha Mustafa Hassan as Affan
Anwaar Beg Moghal as Noor-ud-deen
Farhan Ahmed Malhi as Waheed
Preet as Azlain
Waris Khan as restaurant Manager

Production
The series was earlier titled Mangharat but the makers changed it to Kaisa Hai Naseeban.

Reception 
Ramsha Khan's performance was highlighted in a review by The Nation.

Awards and nominations 
Zeb Bangash was nominated for Best Original Sountrack at Lux Style Awards 2020

References

External links

Pakistani drama television series
2019 Pakistani television series debuts
2019 Pakistani television series endings
Urdu-language television shows
Pakistani family television dramas
ARY Digital original programming